"The Country of the Blind" is a short story by English writer H. G. Wells. It was first published in the April 1904 issue of The Strand Magazine and included in a 1911 collection of Wells's short stories, The Country of the Blind and Other Stories. It is one of Wells's best known short stories, and features prominently in literature dealing with blindness.

Wells later revised the story, with the expanded version first published by an English private printer, Golden Cockerel Press, in 1939.

Plot summary

While attempting to climb the unconquered crest of Parascotopetl (a fictitious mountain in Ecuador), a mountaineer named Nuñez slips and falls down the far side of the mountain. At the end of his descent, down a snow-slope in the mountain's shadow, he finds a valley, cut off from the rest of the world on all sides by steep precipices. Unknown to Nuñez, he has discovered the fabled "Country of the Blind". The valley had been a haven for settlers fleeing the tyranny of Spanish rulers, until an earthquake reshaped the surrounding mountains, cutting the valley off forever from future explorers. The isolated community prospered over the years, despite a disease that struck them early on, rendering all newborns blind. As the blindness slowly spread over many generations, the people's remaining senses sharpened, and by the time the last sighted villager had died, the community had fully adapted to life without sight.

Nuñez descends into the valley and finds an unusual village with windowless houses and a network of paths, all bordered by kerbs. Upon discovering that everyone is blind, Nuñez begins reciting to himself the proverb, "In the Country of the Blind, the One-Eyed Man is King".   He realizes that he can teach and rule them, but the villagers have no concept of sight, and do not understand his attempts to explain this fifth sense to them. Frustrated, Nuñez becomes angry, but the villagers calm him, and he reluctantly submits to their way of life, because returning to the outside world seems impossible.

Nuñez is assigned to work for a villager named Yacob. He becomes attracted to Yacob's youngest daughter, Medina-Saroté. Nuñez and Medina-Saroté soon fall in love, and having won her confidence, Nuñez slowly starts trying to explain sight to her. Medina-Saroté, however, simply dismisses it as his imagination. When Nuñez asks for her hand in marriage, he is turned down by the village elders on account of his "unstable" obsession with "sight". The village doctor suggests that Nuñez's eyes be removed, claiming that they are diseased and are "greatly distended" and because of this "his brain is in a state of constant irritation and distraction." Nuñez reluctantly consents to the operation because of his love for Medina-Saroté. However, at sunrise on the day of the operation, while all the villagers are asleep, Nuñez, the failed King of the Blind, sets off for the mountains (without provisions or equipment), hoping to find a passage to the outside world, and escape the valley.

In the original story, Nuñez climbs high into the surrounding mountains until night falls, and he rests, weak with cuts and bruises, but happy that he has escaped the valley. His fate is not revealed. In the revised and expanded 1939 version of the story, Nuñez sees from a distance that there is about to be a rock slide. He attempts to warn the villagers, but again they scoff at his "imagined" sight. He flees the valley during the slide, taking Medina-Saroté with him.

Characters
Nuñez – a mountaineer from Bogotá, Colombia
Yacob – Nuñez's master
Medina-Saroté – the youngest daughter of Yacob

Adaptations
Several radio adaptations of the story have been produced. Escape debuted its adaptation starring William Conrad on Thanksgiving week, 1947, which featured a different ending in which Nuñez escapes the Valley alone (and thus is able to tell the story in-character), but goes blind in the process due to the constant glare from the snow. Another episode of Escape aired 20 June 1948, starring Paul Frees. In 1954, 1957 and 1959 the CBS radio series Suspense rebroadcast this version. CBS Radio Mystery Theater aired another radio adaptation 7 May 1979. The episode was titled "Search for Eden" (episode 977) and the main characters' names were changedNunez was renamed Carlos and Medina-Saroté was renamed Eva. The BBC folded the story in two others by Wells for a BBC Radio 4 Extra entitled "The Door in the Wall", also with a twist at the end in which the storyteller reveals himself to be the tale's protagonist.
A teleplay written by Frank Gabrielsen was produced in 1962 for the TV series The DuPont Show of the Week. The title of the hour-long episode was "The Richest Man in Bogota", and it aired on 17 June 1962. It starred Lee Marvin as Juan de Nuñez, and Míriam Colón as "Marina" (not Medina-Saroté, as in the original story). In this story it is revealed that something in the water of the valley has caused the blindness of the residents. At the end of the episode Juan de Nuñez is shown to now be blind as well.
The Russian studio Soyuzmultfilm made a wordless 19-minute animated film adaptation in 1995 called Land of Blind (Страна Слепых).
The theme of the protagonist getting lost in the world of the blind was used in the 1997 Malayalam movie Guru starring Mohanlal.
The composer Mark-Anthony Turnage wrote a chamber opera based on the story, completed in 1997.
A stage production was written by Frank Higgins and Mark Evans; the only production to date has been in The Coterie Theater in Kansas City, Missouri in 2006.
A Chinese version of a graded reader was adapted under the name 盲人国 (Mángrén Guó) as part of the Mandarin Companion series. The location was adapted from Ecuador to China's province of Guizhou. A twist at the ending indicates the blindness condition affecting the people is contagious.
An audio version of "The Country of Blind" was published in the Indian language of Malayalam.

See also
 Tall poppy syndrome

Notes

References

External links

The Country of the Blind Original H. G. Wells short story in the April 1904 issue of The Strand Magazine
The Country of the Blind Short story by H. G. Wells
The Country of the Blind and Other Stories – Public-domain text from Project Gutenberg

Streaming Audio
The Country of the Blind on Escape: 26 November 1947
The Country of the Blind on Escape: 20 June 1948
The Country of the Blind on Favorite Story: 23 April 1949
The Country of the Blind on Suspense: 27 October 1957

Short stories by H. G. Wells
1904 short stories
Short stories adapted into films
Literature about blindness
Works originally published in The Strand Magazine
Works adapted into operas
South America in fiction